Air Bahia was an airline with flights to Mexico which also served Las Vegas and Tucson during its existence.

History
The short-lived Air Bahia, based in San Diego, operated its first scheduled service on August 18, 1979. Its operations included service to Los Angeles (LAX), Long Beach (LGB), San Diego via both Lindbergh Field (SAN) and Gillespie Field (SEE), Santa Ana via Orange County Airport (SNA), Palm Springs (PSP), Carlsbad via McClellan-Palomar Airport (CLD), El Centro (IPL), Calexico (CXL) and various points in Baja California and elsewhere in Mexico.  In July 1980, Air Bahia was operating high frequency shuttle service between San Diego Lindbergh Field and Los Angeles (LAX) with twelve round trip flights every weekday and also between San Diego Lindbergh Field and Tijuana, Mexico with thirteen round trip flights every weekday. Its flights arrived and departed from the eastern terminal building at Lindbergh Field which it shared with National Airlines (1934-1980), Pacific Southwest Airlines (PSA) and United Airlines at the time.

The airline operated only a small handful of twin prop commuter aircraft, including the Piper Chieftain, Piper Navajo and the Britten-Norman BN-2 Islander. 

Air Bahia operated scheduled international passenger service from Lindbergh Field, McClellan-Palomar Airport and Gillespie Field in San Diego County to several Mexican destinations and also flew nonstop between Tucson (TUS) and Guaymas, Mexico.  Its timetables advertised connecting services to and from jet flights operated by Aeromexico and Mexicana de Aviacion in Mexico.  Other routes included nonstop service between Las Vegas (LAS) and both Carlsbad and Long Beach.  The airline's fleet service center was located at Southern Cal Aircraft Repair at Gillespie Field.

In December 1980, Air Bahia filed for bankruptcy and all flights ceased. Reorganization under Chapter 11 failed, and the company folded up in 1981 without resuming flights.

Destinations:  1979-1980
According to Air Bahia route maps from 1979 and 1980, the airline served the following destinations:

Arizona
 Tucson (TUS)

California
 Calexico (CXL)
 Carlsbad via McClellan Palomar Airport (CLD)
 El Centro via the Imperial County Airport (IPL)
 Long Beach (LGB)
 Los Angeles (LAX)
 Palm Springs (PSP)
 San Diego via both Lindbergh Field (SAN) and Gillespie Field (SEE)
 Santa Ana via Orange County Airport (SNA, now John Wayne Airport)

Nevada
 Las Vegas (LAS)

Mexico
 Ensenada (ESE)
 Guaymas (GYM) 
 San Felipe (SFH)
 Tijuana (TIJ)

See also 
 List of defunct airlines of the United States

References

R. E. G. Davies, Commuter Airlines of the United States. Smithsonian Books, 1995.

External links
AirBaha photos

Defunct airlines of the United States
Airlines established in 1979
Airlines disestablished in 1981
Companies that filed for Chapter 11 bankruptcy in 1980
1979 establishments in California
1981 disestablishments in California
Airlines based in California